The Dominican Republic competed in the 2015 Pan American Games in Toronto, Ontario, Canada from July 10 to 26, 2015. The country had 250 athletes in 26 sports.

Boxer Juan Ramón Solano was selected to be the flagbearer of the team during the opening ceremony. But shooter Eduardo Lorenzo carried the flag instead.

Competitors
The following table lists The Dominican Republic's delegation per sport and gender.

Medalists

The following competitors from the Dominican Republic won medals at the games. In the by discipline sections below, medalists' names are bolded.

Archery

The Dominican Republic qualified two male and one female archers based on its performance at the 2014 Pan American Championships. Later the Dominican Republic qualified 1 more women based on its performance at the 2015 Copa Merengue.

Men

Women

Athletics

Men

Women

Badminton

The Dominican Republic has qualified a team of six athletes (three men and three women).

Men

Women

Mixed

Baseball

The Dominican Republic has qualified a men's baseball team of 24 athletes.

Men's tournament

Group A

Basketball

The Dominican Republic has qualified a men's and women's teams. Each team will consist of 12 athletes, for a total of 24.

Men's tournament

Group B

Semifinals

Bronze medal match

Women's tournament

Group A

Seventh place match

Beach volleyball

The Dominican Republic has qualified a men's and women's pair for a total of four athletes, but declined its quota.

Bowling

Singles

Pairs

Boxing

Men

Women

Canoeing

Sprint
The Dominican Republic received one wildcard in men's canoeing.

Men

Qualification Legend: QF = Qualify to final; QS = Qualify to semifinal

Cycling

Road cycling
Men

Diving

The Dominican Republic qualified one male diver.

Men

Equestrian

The Dominican Republic has qualified an athlete.

Dressage
Argentina has qualified a full dressage team.

Jumping
The Dominican Republic has qualified two athletes.

Individual

Fencing

The Dominican Republic has qualified 6 female fencers.

Women

Field hockey

The Dominican Republic has qualified a women's team, of 16 athletes.

Women's tournament

Team

Pool A

Quarterfinal

Classification semifinal

Seventh place match

Gymnastics

Artistic
The Dominican Republic qualified 2 athletes.

Men
Individual Qualification

Qualification Legend: Q = Qualified to apparatus final

Women
Individual Qualification

Qualification Legend: Q = Qualified to apparatus final
Individual finals

Handball

Dominican Republic has qualified a men's team of 15 athletes.

Men's tournament

Group A

Judo

The Dominican Republic has qualified a team of eight judokas (four men and four women).

Men

Women

Karate

The Dominican Republic has qualified 9 athletes.

Men

Women

Modern pentathlon

Dominican Republic has qualified a team of 2 male athletes.

Men

Roller sports

The Dominican Republic has qualified two athletes.

Figure skating

Speed Skating

Men

Racquetball

The Dominican Republic has qualified a team of two men.

Men

Shooting

The Dominican Republic has qualified eight shooters.

Men

Match shooting

Women

Softball

The Dominican Republic has qualified both a men's and women's teams. Each team will consist of 15 athletes for a total of 30.

Men's tournament

Team

Group A

Women's tournament

Team

Group A

Table tennis

The Dominican Republic has qualified a men's and women's team.

Men

Women

Taekwondo

The Dominican Republic has qualified a team of six athletes (three men and three women).

Tennis

Singles

Doubles

Volleyball

The Dominican Republic has qualified a women's team of 12 athletes.

Women's tournament

Team

Standings

Preliminary round

|}

Semifinals

|}

Bronze medal match

|}

Water skiing

Weightlifting

The Dominican Republic has qualified a team of 12 athletes (4 men and 6 women).

Men

Women

Wrestling

The Dominican Republic has qualified a team of 3 athletes.
Men's freestyle

Greco-Roman

See also
Dominican Republic at the 2016 Summer Olympics

References

Nations at the 2015 Pan American Games
P
2015